Wilborn is a surname. Notable people with the surname include:
 Carlton Wilborn (born 1964), American dancer, actor, author, and motivational speaker
 Charles M. Wilborn, American sound engineer
 Claude Wilborn (1912–1992), baseball right fielder
 Dave Wilborn (1904–1982), American jazz singer
 Frithjof Wilborn (born 1961), Norwegian footballer and television presenter
 Marshall Wilborn (born 1952), American bass player and composer
 Rick Wilborn, politician
 Ted Wilborn (born 1958), Major League Baseball outfielder